"Dance Tonight" is the debut single of American R&B group Lucy Pearl, written by Raphael Saadiq, Ali Shaheed Muhammad, and Dawn Robinson and the first single taken from their self-titled debut album. Serviced to radio on the week of March 27, 2000, the single peaked at number 36 on both the US Billboard Hot 100 and the UK Singles Chart, and it reached the top 40 in Canada and the Netherlands. It was nominated to Best R&B Performance by a Duo or Group at the 43rd Grammy Awards (2001) but lost to Destiny's Child's "Say My Name".

Critical reception
Billboard editor Chuck Taylor wrote of the song, calling "Dance Tonight" a "smooth uptempo track that truly makes you want to dance tonight." He praised the vocal performances of Raphael Saadiq and Dawn Robinson, noting that Saadiq's vocals were "easy to distinguish" and reminiscent of his career with Tony! Toni! Toné! while describing Robinson's backing vocals as "sweet and sensual."

Music video
The music video for the song shows Ali Shaheed Muhammad, Dawn Robinson, and Raphael Saadiq preparing to go a dance party being held at night. Interspersed with scenes from the movie, Love and Basketball, are scenes from the video, which include Dawn repeatedly being shown topless, putting makeup on in front of a mirror. A later scene shows her getting up in slow motion.

Track listings

UK CD single
 "Dance Tonight" – 3:52
 "Dance Tonight" (Linslee Campbell mix) – 4:05
 "Dance Tonight" (Groove Chronicles mix) – 5:27
 "Dance Tonight" (video) – 3:41

UK 12-inch single
A1. "Dance Tonight" – 3:52
A2. "Dance Tonight" (Groove Chronicles mix) – 5:27
B1. "Dance Tonight" (Linslee Campbell mix) – 4:05

UK cassette single
 "Dance Tonight" – 3:52
 "Dance Tonight" (Linslee Campbell mix) – 4:05
 "Dance Tonight" (Groove Chronicles mix) – 5:27

European CD single
 "Dance Tonight" – 3:52
 "Dance Tonight" (Linslee Campbell mix radio edit) – 3:23

Charts

Weekly charts

Year-end charts

Release history

References

2000 debut singles
2000 songs
Songs about dancing
Songs written by Ali Shaheed Muhammad
Songs written by Dawn Robinson
Songs written by Raphael Saadiq
Virgin Records singles